Ace Ventura: When Nature Calls (also known as Ace Ventura 2: When Nature Calls) is a 1995 American detective comedy film and the sequel to Ace Ventura: Pet Detective (1994), and the second installment of Ace Ventura franchise. Jim Carrey reprises his role as the title character Ace Ventura, a detective who specializes in retrieval of tame and captive animals, and has been summoned to Africa to locate a missing bat. Ian McNeice, Simon Callow, and Sophie Okonedo co-star. Tommy Davidson, who co-starred with Carrey on the show In Living Color, makes a cameo appearance in the film. The film was written and directed by Carrey's close friend Steve Oedekerk, who had also collaborated in the production and as a character consultant for the first film.

Plot
In the Himalayas, after a failed rescue mission results in a raccoon falling to its death (a parody of Cliffhanger), Ace Ventura succumbs to severe depression and joins a Tibetan monastery. Once he has recovered, he is approached by Fulton Greenwall, an English correspondent working for the consulate of Bonai Province in the fictional African country of Nibia. Because Ace is a liability for the monastery, the Grand Abbot gives Ace excuses to justify his departure, and sends him off with Greenwall.

Greenwall is subjected to Ventura's questionable behavior when he starts mimicking different mating calls, and his reckless driving when they head along to Africa, warning him about the hostility of eastern lowland gorillas, as it is mating season. Greenwall wants Ventura to find the Great White bat 'Shikaka', a sacred animal of the native Wachati tribe, which disappeared shortly after being offered as dowry of the Wachati Princess, who is set to wed the Wachootoo Prince in a marriage of state. After arriving in Nibia and meeting with consul Vincent Cadby, Ace begins his investigation, but must overcome his fear of bats in order to succeed.

Accompanied by his pet capuchin monkey Spike, Ace begins his search for the missing bat. He eventually befriends the tribe's princess, who tries to seduce Ace. However, Ace admits his oath to clerical celibacy. Ace also befriends the tribal prince, Ouda, who assists Ace. Ace's investigation involves eliminating obvious suspects—animal traders, poachers, and a safari park owner among others—and enduring the growing escalations of threat between the Wachati and the Wachootoo. After being tranquilized, Ace suspects the medicine-man of the Wachootoo of taking the bat, as he strongly disapproves of the wedding.

He and Ouda sneak into the Wachootoo tribal village with hopes of finding the bat, and are soon captured. The Wachootoo mistake Ace as the "White Devil", and after Ouda poorly translates Ace's words, they are convinced he wants to fight them and have him go through many painful and humiliating challenges to gain their trust. He creatively passes them all, and his final challenge is a 'Circle of Death' fight with their toughest warrior—who, although tiny, humiliatingly defeats Ace. Ace's antics entertain the Wachootoo, who grant Ace their trust and release him.

Despite this, the Wachootoo declare that if the bat is not returned in time, they will declare war on the Wachati tribe. As a parting joke, Ace is shot in the buttock by a non-drugged blow-dart by the Chief to make his people laugh again. As he and Ouda walk back to the village, Ace realizes the dart he was shot with earlier is not the same as the one he was just shot with, meaning that the Wachootoo didn't take Shikaka. He also determines that the dart which shot him earlier was carved from a rare red fungus-bearing acala. This leads him to find two Australian poachers with the bat, and he distracts them by mimicking a Silverback mating call. They don't fall for it and shoot the initial darts into him, take him away and attempt to kill him by tying him to a raft which is sent over a waterfall.

After coming to, Ace survives and wrestles a Nile crocodile. Ace tries to figure out how the poachers are involved with the war between the tribes. Flummoxed by the case, Ace consults the Grand Abbot via astral projection. Advised by the Abbot, Ace deduces that Cadby has taken the bat, having planned to let the tribes destroy each other so that he can then take possession of the numerous bat caves containing guano to sell as fertilizer worth billions. When Ace confronts Cadby, he learns he was hired as Cadby's alibi once an investigation takes place, and is arrested by tribal security chief Hitu. Ace escapes with help from an Asian elephant who joins him and more jungle animals to raid Cadby's house. Cadby tries to shoot Ace, but is stopped by Greenwall when he punches him in the face. Cadby escapes with the bat in a Land Rover, but Ace follows him in a monster truck. Ace destroys Cadby's car, leaving the bat cage lodged in a tree.

Ace, despite his chronic fear of bats, courageously yet dramatically grabs the bat with his bare hands and returns it just as the tribes are about to fight each other on the battlefield. Cadby, watching nearby, is noticed by Ouda, who calls him the "White Devil" and incites both tribes to pursue him, giving Ace more time. After escaping, Cadby encounters an amorous Silverback eastern lowland gorilla, who mistakes him for a mate. The Wachati Princess is married to the Wachootoo Prince, who is revealed to be the 'tiny, wild' warrior who humiliated Ace during the 'Circle of Death' tribal challenge earlier. Moments later, it is discovered that the young bride is no longer a virgin, on Ace's account. Despite this, peace between the once-separate tribes is achieved when the two tribes join together and chase after Ace.

Cast

 Jim Carrey as Ace Ventura
 Ian McNeice as Fulton Greenwall
 Simon Callow as Vincent Cadby
 Maynard Eziashi as Prince Ouda
 Bob Gunton as Burton Quinn
 Damon Standifer as the Wachati chief
 Sophie Okonedo as the Wachati princess
 Arsenio 'Sonny' Trinidad as Ashram monk / Grand abbot
 Danny Daniels as Wachootoo shaman
 Andrew Steel as Mick Katie
 Bruce Spence as Gahjii
 Adewale as Hitu
 Tommy Davidson as Tiny Warrior / Wachootoo prince
 Michael Reid McKay as Skinny husband / Monopoly guy
 Kristin Norton as Pompous woman

Production

Filming
Filming began under Tom DeCerchio, who later directed Celtic Pride (1996). Because of the success of the first film, Morgan Creek Entertainment Group gave lead-actor Jim Carrey the power to decide the director. In April 1995, Carrey had DeCerchio replaced with Steve Oedekerk, who had worked on the film's predecessor as a script consultant and wrote the screenplay for this film, but had no previous experience with directing feature films. Spike Jonze wanted to direct the film, but Carrey turned him down as he also had no experience but he mainly did not know him well enough. Carrey claims this to be one of his biggest regrets. However, Carrey reiterated he does not regret enlisting Oedekerk to direct as they were friends with creative similarities, which included improvising, changing scenes during filming, and had a vast understanding of the main character. In June 1995, scenes were shot in South Carolina. The following month, filming took place outside Hondo, near San Antonio, Texas.

Part of the film was also shot in British Columbia, Canada. The film was shot in Super 35. Carrey was paid $10 million for his role due to Oedekerk's authority as director.

Music

Soundtrack
Ace Ventura: When Nature Calls is a 1995 soundtrack on this film by composer Robert Folk.

 "Africa (What Made You So Strong)" - 3:28 (Johnny Clegg and Savuka)
 "Spirits in the Material World" – 4:41 (Sting and Pato Banton)
 "Secret Agent Man" – 2:16 (Blues Traveler)
 "Don't Change" – 3:41 (Goo Goo Dolls)
 "Burnin' Rubber" – 3:18 (Mr. Mirainga)
 "Boll Weevil" – 3:17 (The Presidents of the United States of America)
 "Blur the Technicolor" – 4:09 (White Zombie)
 "Watusi Rodeo" – 2:35 (The Reverend Horton Heat)
 "Here Comes the Night" – 3:28 (Native)
 "Jungle Groove" – 5:13 (Montell Jordan)
 "Ife" – 4:23 (Angélique Kidjo)
 "My Pet" – 2:47 (Matthew Sweet)
 "It's Aliright" – 4:54 (Blessid Union of Souls)
 "Ace in Africa" – 4:40 (Robert Folk)

Release

Theatrical
Ace Ventura: When Nature Calls was released on November 10, 1995.

Home media
Ace Ventura: When Nature Calls was released on Blu-ray by Warner Home Video on September 3, 2013, and on April 23, 2019 by Sony Pictures Home Entertainment.

Reception

Box office
The film grossed $37,804,076 during its opening weekend, taking the #1 spot. In the U.S. and Canada, the film grossed $108.3 million, and in other territories, it grossed $104 million. The worldwide gross was $212.3 million. Against its $30 million budget, Ace Ventura: When Nature Calls was a major financial success, surpassing its predecessor.

Critical response
On Rotten Tomatoes, the film has an approval rating of 21% based on 28 reviews, with an average rating of 4/10. The site's critical consensus reads: "Nature Calls in this Ace Ventura sequel, and it's answered by the law of diminishing returns". On Metacritic, the film received a weighted average score of 45 out of 100, based on 17 critics, indicating "mixed or average reviews". Audiences surveyed by CinemaScore gave the film a grade B+ on scale of A to F.

Accolades
1996 ASCAP Award
 Top Box Office Films – Robert Folk (Won)

1996 American Comedy Award
 Funniest Actor in a Motion Picture (Leading Role) – Jim Carrey (Nominated)

1996 Kid's Choice Awards
 Favorite Movie – (Won)
 Favorite Movie Actor – Jim Carrey (Won)

1996 MTV Movie Awards
 Best Male Performance – Jim Carrey (Won)
 Best Comedic Performance – Jim Carrey (Won)
 Best Kiss – Jim Carrey and Sophie Okonedo (Nominated)

1996 Razzie Awards
 Worst Remake or Sequel – James G. Robinson (Nominated)

 1996 Stinkers Bad Movie Awards
 Worst Picture – James G. Robinson (Nominated)
 Worst Actor – Jim Carrey (Nominated)
 Most Painfully Unfunny Comedy – James G. Robinson (Won)
 Worst Sequel – James G. Robinson (Won)
 The Sequel Nobody Was Clamoring For – James G. Robinson (Nominated)

Sequel

A standalone made-for-TV sequel, titled Ace Ventura Jr.: Pet Detective, was released in 2009 to poor reception.

In March 2021, there were reports that a direct sequel under the working title Ace Ventura 3 is in development at Amazon Studios. Pat Casey and Josh Miller, writers of Sonic the Hedgehog, were attached as writers for the film. Although there are no official plans for the film, Jim Carrey joked that he would star in the movie if Christopher Nolan was to direct the film.

References

External links

 
 
 Ace Ventura: When Nature Calls exclusive clip and still licensing at Visual Icon
 

Ace Ventura
1995 films
1995 comedy films
1990s comedy mystery films
American comedy mystery films
1990s English-language films
Morgan Creek Productions films
Warner Bros. films
American sequel films
Films about Tibet
Films set in the Himalayas
Films shot in South Carolina
Films shot in San Antonio
Films shot in British Columbia
Films directed by Steve Oedekerk
Films scored by Robert Folk
Films with screenplays by Steve Oedekerk
Swahili-language films
Films set in Africa
Films shot in Kenya
Films shot in Uganda
Films about elephants
1995 directorial debut films
Films about monkeys
Films about gorillas
Films about bats
Films about lions
Films about horses
Films about birds
Films about reptiles
American war comedy films
1990s American films